Kansky's, also known as Kanski's, Big Skookum, and Devil's Mountain Lodge, is a former boarding house, now used as a hunting lodge, located at mile 42 of the Nabesna Road in Wrangell–St. Elias National Park and Preserve of eastern Alaska.  The property includes a log cabin, bunkhouse, and storage building, which were built in 1934 by Steve Kanski to provide lodging and travel services to road crews and workers at the nearby mines.  The property, a private inholding within the bounds of the national park, is now operated as a hunting lodge.

The property was listed on the National Register of Historic Places in 1997.

See also
National Register of Historic Places listings in Wrangell–St. Elias National Park and Preserve
National Register of Historic Places listings in Copper River Census Area, Alaska

References

External links
 Devil's Mountain Lodge web site

1934 establishments in Alaska
Buildings and structures completed in 1934
Buildings and structures on the National Register of Historic Places in Copper River Census Area, Alaska
Hotel buildings on the National Register of Historic Places in Alaska
Hunting lodges in the United States
National Register of Historic Places in Wrangell–St. Elias National Park and Preserve